Kalokol Airport , also named Fergusons Gulf Airport, is an airport located in Kalokol, a village in Turkana County in northwestern Kenya, on the western shores of Lake Turkana, close to the International border with Ethiopia.

The geographic coordinates of this airport are:3° 29' 24.00"N, 35° 50' 24.00"E (Latitude:3.490000; Longitude:35.840000).

Overview
Kalokol Airport is a small civilian airport, serving the village of Kalokol.

Airlines and destinations
None at the moment.

See also
 Kenya Airports Authority
 Kenya Civil Aviation Authority
 List of airports in Kenya

References

External links
  Location of Kalokol Airport At Google Maps
  Website of Kenya Airports Authority
 List of Airports In Kenya

Airports in Kenya
Airports in Rift Valley Province
Turkana County